Bayt al-Shaykh Yunis (also spelled Beit al-Sheikh Yunes) is a village in northwestern Syria, administratively part of the Tartus Governorate. It is located between Safita (to the east) and Ras al-Khashufah (to the west). According to the Syria Central Bureau of Statistics (CBS), Bayt al-Shaykh Yunis had a population of 2,199 in the 2004 census. Its inhabitants are predominantly Alawites.

References

Populated places in Safita District
Alawite communities in Syria